Ledet is a surname. Notable people with the surname include:

Joshua Ledet (born 1992), American singer
Rosie Ledet (born 1971), American accordionist and singer
Justin Ledet (born 1988), American mixed martial artist and boxer

See also
Law Enforcement Detachments, LEDETs